The 1998 Rado Open was a men's tennis tournament played on Clay in Gstaad, Switzerland that was part of the International Series of the 1998 ATP Tour. It was the thirty-first edition of the tournament and was held from 6 July – 12 July 1998.

Seeds
Champion seeds are indicated in bold text while text in italics indicates the round in which those seeds were eliminated.

Draw

Finals

Qualifying

Qualifying seeds

Qualifiers
  Joan Balcells /  Alberto Berasategui

Lucky losers
  Marco Chiudinelli /  Jun Kato

Qualifying draw

References

External links
 Official results archive (ATP)
 Official results archive (ITF)

Swiss Open (tennis)
Doubles